Mohammed Hilal may refer to:

 Mohammed Helal (footballer, born 1995), Emirati footballer for Al Ain
 Mohammed Helal (footballer, born 1997), Emirati footballer for Baniyas

See also 
 Helal Mohammed